Morgan Calvin Hamilton (February 25, 1809 – November 21, 1893) was an American merchant, politician from Alabama and Texas, and brother of Andrew Jackson Hamilton. Both men were unusual as Unionists in Texas during the American Civil War.

Early life and education
Morgan Calvin Hamilton was born in Madison County, Alabama near Huntsville. His siblings included Andrew Jackson Hamilton.

He moved to Texas when it was still part of Mexico and worked there as a merchant. For six years, 1839–45, he served in the war department of the Republic of Texas, first as clerk and in 1844–45 as secretary of war. He settled in Austin.

One of the few Texan abolitionists, Hamilton fought for Union forces in the Civil War. During Reconstruction, he was elected by the Texas state legislature to the US Senate as a Radical Republican. He is buried in the Oakwood Cemetery in Austin, Texas.

External links
 Biographic sketch at U.S. Congress website
 

1809 births
1893 deaths
People from Madison County, Alabama
Republican Party United States senators from Texas
Liberal Republican Party United States senators from Texas
Texas Republicans
Texas Liberal Republicans
19th-century American politicians
American abolitionists
People of Texas in the American Civil War
Southern Unionists in the American Civil War
Burials at Oakwood Cemetery (Austin, Texas)